Archedemus or Archedamus ( or Άρχέδαμος -- he's called "Archidamus" by Livy) was an Aetolian who commanded the Aetolian troops which assisted the Romans in the Second Macedonian War with Philip V of Macedon.

In 199 BCE he compelled Philip to raise the siege of the town of Thaumaci, and took an active part in the Battle of Cynoscephalae in 197, in which Philip was defeated. When the war broke out between the Romans and the Aetolians, he was sent as ambassador to the Achaeans to solicit their assistance in 192; and on the defeat of Antiochus III the Great in the following year, he went as ambassador to the consul Manius Acilius Glabrio to sue for peace. In 169, he was denounced to the Romans by Lyciscus as one of their enemies. He joined Perseus of Macedon the same year, and accompanied the Macedonian king in his flight after his defeat in 168.

Notes

3rd-century BC births
Second Macedonian War
3rd-century BC Greek people
2nd-century BC Greek people
Ancient Aetolians